Richard Yeo Swee Chye is an American scientist with 17 U.S. patents, best known for his research on disposable diapers.

Research

Disposable diapers
Yeo co-invented US patent 5,356,626: "Synthetic fecal fluid compound." At the time, Yeo was a senior research scientist working in Roswell, Georgia for Kimberly-Clark, makers of Huggies. He, along with Debra Welchel, developed the material to help the company produce better disposable diapers.

Yeo described his research as:

Yeo conducted extensive research & developed various disposable diapers & personal care products having new features: breathable back sheets, colorful/embossed backsheets, improved BM flaps and better BM containment, better body liners, flushable materials for constructing diapers, odor control, and better tampons.

Nafion & fuel cells
From 1970-75, Yeo conducted doctorate thesis research on Nafion under the supervision of Adi Eisenberg (Otto Maass Professor of McGill University). In 1977, Yeo and Eisenberg published the earliest peer-reviewed journal article on Nafion.

Yeo continued to publish on Nafion, conducting several comprehensive theoretical studies of the swelling properties of Nafion membrane in various organic and methanol-containing solvents. Yeo found that these perfluorinated ionomer membranes exhibit dual cohesive energy densities. This was referred to by McCain and Covitch as the Yeo Envelope. The commercial importance of Yeo's earliest studies of the unique swelling behavior of Nafion membrane was cited and described by Doyle and Rajendran in the Handbook of Fuel Cells as:

Publications

Book chapters and editing
 
 
 
 
 A Guide to Advanced Level Physics (published in Singapore).

Articles
 "Survey on Separators for Electrochemical Systems," Lawrence Berkeley Laboratory Report # 18937, US Department of Energy, 1984.
 "Electrochemical Separation Processes – Industrial Needs," in Tutorial Lectures inElectrochemical Engineering and Technology – II, American Institute of Chemical Engineers Symposium Series, Ed. By R. Alkire and D-T. Chin, (1983), pg. 205.
 "Membranes and Diaphragms in Industrial Electrochemical Processes," in Proceedings of the Workshop on Electrochemistry Research Needs for Mineral and Primary Materials Processing, Ed. By T. J. O'Keefe and J. Evans, Rolla, Missouri, (1983), pg. 51-58.
 "Novel Hybrid Separators for Alkaline Zinc Batteries," in Proceedings of Advances in Battery Materials and Processes, Ed. By J. McBreen, R. Yeo, and D-T Chin, Electrochemical Society, 1984, pg. 206. & "Research on separators for alkaline zinc batteries" LBL Report.
 "Transport Properties of Nafion Membranes in Electrochemically Regenerative Hydrogen/halogen Cells," J. of Electrochem. Soc.,126, 1682 (1979).
 "Ruthenium-Based Mixed Oxides as Electrocatalysts for Oxygen Evolution in Acid Electrolytes," J. of Electrochem. Soc., 128, no. 9, (1981)
 "Perfluorosulphonic Acid (Nafion) Membrane as a Separator for an Advanced Alkaline Water Electrolyser," J. of Applied Electrochem, 10, 741 (1980).
 "A Hydrogen-Bromine Cell for Energy Storage Applications," J. of Electrochem. Soc., 127, 549 (1980).
 "An electrochemically regenerative hydrogen-chlorine energy storage system: electrode kinetics and cell performance," J. Applied Electrochem., 10, 393 (1981).
 "An Electrochemically Regenerative Hydrogen-Chlorine Energy Storage System: A Study of Mass and Heat Balances, J. Electrochem. Soc., Volume 126, Issue 5, pp. 713-720 (1979)
 "Swelling Properties of Nafion and Radiation Grafted Cation Exchange Membranes," J. Membrane Sci., 9, (1981) 273.
 "Sorption and transport behavior of perfluorinated ionomer membranes in concentrated NaOH solution Electrochimica Acta (December 1985), 30 (12), pg. 1585-1590
 "Corrosion of polymer–concrete composites in hydrochloric acid at elevated temperature," J. Appl. Polym. Sci., 26, 1159 (1981).
 "Gas-Solid Exchange Reactions: Zinc Vapor and Monocrystalline Zinc Telluride," Canadian J. of Chemistry, 49, 1953 (1971).

Patents

References

External links
 

Living people
American people of Chinese descent
Hokkien scientists
Year of birth missing (living people)